Overnight Sensation or Overnight Happiness is a 1932 German comedy film directed by Max Neufeld and starring Magda Schneider, Hermann Thimig, and S. Z. Sakall.

The film's sets were designed by the art director Max Heilbronner. It was shot at the Grunewald Studios in Berlin and on location in Locarno. It was distributed by the German branch of Universal Pictures.

Synopsis
An inventor working on the development of a rocket enlists the help of a young woman he meets in the night to help him persuade a financier to back his scheme.

Cast

References

Bibliography

External links 
 

1932 films
1932 comedy films
German comedy films
1930s German-language films
Films directed by Max Neufeld
Films of the Weimar Republic
Universal Pictures films
German black-and-white films
1930s German films